Naguma Dam is an earthfill dam located in Chiba Prefecture in Japan. The dam is used for irrigation. The catchment area of the dam is 0.7 km2. The dam impounds about 53  ha of land when full and can store 245 thousand cubic meters of water. The construction of the dam was started on 1974 and completed in 1979.

References

Dams in Chiba Prefecture
1979 establishments in Japan